Higienópolis (from the Greek Hygieia + Polis) is a neighborhood in the city of Porto Alegre, the state capital of Rio Grande do Sul in Brazil.

External links

 Porto Alegre City Homepage

Neighbourhoods in Porto Alegre